The Suzuki VL 1500 Intruder LC and Boulevard C90 are cruiser motorcycles with a feet-forward riding posture, shaft drive and engine balance shafts made by Suzuki from 1998 to 2004 as the Intruder, and since 2005 as the Boulevard.

After VL production ended with model year 2004, Suzuki replaced the motorcycle in its model range with the 2005 fuel-injected Boulevard C90, which is being produced as of 2013.

VL 1500 Intruder LC
The original Suzuki VL 1500 Intruder LC had a  seat height and an underseat  fuel tank. Its new engine is designed to produce a claimed  @ 4,800 rpm, and  @ 2,300 rpm torque. In 2004, Suzuki added a four-way emergency flasher/high beam passing switch, multi-reflector turn signals, hydraulic valve lash adjusters, hydraulic clutch and a back-torque limiter.

The VL name refers to the V-twin engine and "long" frame, 1500 is the approximate metric displacement of the engine, and the LC means Legendary Classic.

Production resumed for the C90 in the 2013 model year.

Boulevard C90

In 2005, Suzuki re-branded its lineup of cruisers as its Boulevard series, renaming the VL1500 the Boulevard C90.  Aside from a name change and cosmetic differences, Suzuki replaced the carburetor with a new multi-port fuel-injection system that was borrowed from Suzuki's Suzuki GSX-R line of racing bikes. They also added a 32-bit ECU processing chip and a marginally revised 3.7 gallon fuel tank.

The engine's torque and acceleration were increased by the introduction of the new fuel-injected system, with dual throttle valve and auto fast-idle systems. The engine uses SCEM cylinder plating. Suzuki said the engine developed  @ 4,800 rpm and  @ 2,300 rpm.

References

External links
 Suzuki VL1500 Intruder (1998-2002) review
 Suzuki C1500T Intruder (2013-on) review

VL 1500 Intruder LC Boulevard C90
Shaft drive motorcycles